The Douglas XA-2 was an American prototype attack aircraft converted from a Douglas O-2 observation aircraft in the spring of 1926 by Douglas Aircraft. Only one prototype aircraft was built and the type was not ordered into production.

Design and development
One Douglas O-2, serial number 25-380, was modified for the new role as an attack aircraft. While the basic structure of the aircraft remained, there were several modifications made. The water-cooled Liberty engine (V-1650) of the O-2 was replaced by an inverted air-cooled Allison VG-1410 engine. The reason for this was that a water cooling system was seen as too vulnerable to enemy attack. The lower engine cowlings were omitted to allow for more cooling air flow over the engine. Second, the A-2 was more heavily armed than the O-2. The A-2 had six forward-firing .30-caliber Browning machine guns - two in the nose forward of the cockpit, and two each in the mid-upper and lower wings. Two .30-caliber Lewis guns were put on a flexible mount for use by the observer-gunner in rear defense of the aircraft. The aircraft also had the capacity for a small bomb load of 100 lb (45 kg).

The Douglas XA-2 was evaluated against the Curtiss XA-3 (a conversion of the Curtiss O-1B observation plane). The Douglas Aircraft won the initial competition, but the Army realized that the Liberty engine was both underpowered and in dwindling supply. It ordered a second competition with both models upgraded with Packard 1A-1500 engines. The Curtiss aircraft won this time and became the U.S. Army Air Corps' frontline attack aircraft (Curtiss A-3 Attack Falcon) from 1928 to 1935.

Operators

United States Army Air Corps

Specifications (XA-2)

See also

References
 

Douglas A-02
A-002
Single-engined tractor aircraft
Biplanes
Aircraft first flown in 1926